Rico Schmider (born June 24, 1991) is a German footballer who currently plays for Kickers Offenbach.

External links

1991 births
Living people
German footballers
SC Preußen Münster players
Kickers Offenbach players
3. Liga players
Association football midfielders